NXT TakeOver: Fatal 4-Way was the second NXT TakeOver professional wrestling livestreaming event produced by WWE. It was held exclusively for wrestlers from the promotion's developmental territory, NXT. The event aired exclusively on the WWE Network and took place on September 11, 2014, at NXT's home base, Full Sail University in Winter Park, Florida. It was also the promotion's second event to carry the Fatal 4-Way name, the first of which was WWE's eponymous pay-per-view in June 2010.

The event consisted of six matches. In the main event, Adrian Neville defeated Sami Zayn, Tyler Breeze, and Tyson Kidd in the eponymous fatal four-way match to retain the NXT Championship. Also on the show, Charlotte defeated Bayley to retain the NXT Women's Championship, and The Lucha Dragons (Kailsto and Sin Cara) won the NXT Tag Team Championship from The Ascension (Konnor and Viktor). Japanese wrestler Hideo Itami also made his NXT debut at the show.

Production

Background
In February 2014, WWE held an event titled TakeOver for their NXT brand, which at the time was a developmental territory for the promotion. The event aired exclusively on the WWE Network. WWE's next NXT event for the WWE Network was titled as NXT TakeOver: Fatal 4-Way. With the announcement of this second TakeOver event, the "TakeOver" name was established as the brand used by WWE for all of their NXT live specials held on the WWE Network. Fatal 4-Way was scheduled to take place on September 11, 2014, at NXT's home arena, Full Sail University in Winter Park, Florida.

WWE previously held a pay-per-view (PPV) titled Fatal 4-Way in 2010 for their Raw and SmackDown brands. It was a gimmick PPV, with several matches contested as fatal four-way matches. This 2010 event was the only WWE PPV to carry the Fatal 4-Way name, after which, the promotion revived the name for this second NXT TakeOver event. Like the 2010 event, TakeOver: Fatal 4-Way was also a gimmick show, as the main event was contested as the titular match.

Storylines

The card comprised six matches. The matches resulted from scripted storylines, where wrestlers portrayed heroes, villains, or less distinguishable characters that built tension and culminated in a wrestling match or series of matches. Results were predetermined by WWE's writers on the NXT brand, while storylines were produced on their weekly television program, NXT.

On February 27, 2014, Adrian Neville defeated Bo Dallas to win the NXT Championship at Arrival. On the May 8 episode of NXT a 20-man battle royal with the winner facing Neville for the NXT Championship ended in a 3-way tie between Sami Zayn, Tyson Kidd, and Tyler Breeze. The next week, Kidd won a Triple Threat match between the three to earn a title match at the first TakeOver, which he lost. That same night, Tyler Breeze cheated his way to victory over Sami Zayn to earn a title match. After this, Neville, Zayn, Breeze and Kidd became involved in a 4-way feud, leading to a fatal four-way match for the title at the event.

In August 2013, Bayley started to team with Charlotte on a regular basis, but they were almost immediately targeted by the BFFs ("Beautiful Fierce Females", Summer Rae and Sasha Banks) as they attempted to convince Bayley to join their side. This storyline culminated with Charlotte turning on Bayley during a match, promptly joining the BFFs instead. On May 1, 2014, Bayley failed to advance in a tournament for the vacant NXT Women's Championship after losing to Sasha in the first round. On June 12, Bayley earned a pinfall over Charlotte, the new NXT Women's Champion, in a six-woman tag team match. In August,  Bayley defeated Sasha Banks to become the #1 contender for the Women's championship held by Charlotte.

Event

Preliminary matches
The event opened with The Ascension (Konnor and Viktor) defending the NXT Tag Team Championship against The Lucha Dragons (Kalisto and Sin Cara). The match ended when Kalisto executed a "Salida Del Sol" on Viktor to win the title.

In the second match, Baron Corbin fought CJ Parker. Corbin executed the "End of Days" on Parker, scoring a pin after only 29 seconds.

After this, Sylvester Lefort and Enzo Amore faced each other in a hair vs. hair match. Amore pinned Lefort with a roll-up for the win. As Lefort quickly left after the match, his partner Marcus Louis had his hair cut instead.

NXT General manager William Regal introduced Kenta, who was making his debut. During his introduction, Kenta announced that he would be known as "Hideo Itami" (meaning "Hero of Pain") from that point on. Moments later, they were interrupted by The Ascension, who were still angry over losing their NXT Tag Team Championship, and they attacked Itami. Konnor demanded a rematch, but Itami attacked The Ascension and chased them away.

The fourth match saw Bull Dempsey wrestle Mojo Rawley. Dempsey executed a diving headbutt on Rawley for the win.

In the penultimate match, Charlotte defended the NXT Women's Championship against Bayley. The match ended when Charlotte executed "Natural Selection" on Bayley to retain the title.

Main event
In the main event, Adrian Neville defended the NXT Championship against Sami Zayn, Tyler Breeze and Tyson Kidd in a fatal-four-way match. During the match, Kidd executed a swinging fisherman's neckbreaker on Zayn for a near-fall. Breeze executed a "Beauty Shot" on Zayn, a "Supermodel Kick" to Kidd and a dropkick in mid-air on Neville. After Neville executed a shooting star press on Zayn, Breeze threw Neville out of the ring and pinned Zayn for a near-fall. Zayn executed a "Helluva Kick" on Kidd, but Neville broke up the pinfall attempt by pulling the referee out of the ring. Neville then performed a "Red Arrow" on Kidd to retain the title.

Results

Footnotes

References 

Fatal 4-Way
2014 in professional wrestling in Florida
2014 WWE Network events
Events in Florida
Professional wrestling in Winter Park, Florida
September 2014 events in the United States